James Whorwood Adeane (1740 – 15 April 1802), of Babraham, Cambridgeshire and Chalgrove, Oxfordshire, was an English Tory politician.

He was the only son of Simon Adeane of Chalgrove and Mary Brydges, niece of James Brydges, 1st Duke of Chandos. He entered the British Army in 1755, rising to the rank of colonel of the 45th Foot in 1788, Lieut-General in 1796 and full General in 1801.

He was a Member (MP) of the Parliament of Great Britain for Cambridge 1780 to May 1789 and for Cambridgeshire 19 May 1789 – 15 April 1802. He was appointed a Groom of the Bedchamber to King George III from 1784 to his death.

He died in 1802. He had married Anne, daughter and heiress of Robert Jones, with whom he had a son Robert Jones Adeane of Babraham, Cambridgeshire (who fathered MP Henry John Adeane) and three daughters.

References

1740 births
1802 deaths
People from South Oxfordshire District
People from Babraham
British Army generals
Members of the Parliament of Great Britain for English constituencies
British MPs 1780–1784
British MPs 1784–1790
British MPs 1790–1796
British MPs 1796–1800
Members of the Parliament of the United Kingdom for English constituencies
UK MPs 1801–1802
James Whorwood
Tory MPs (pre-1834)